Hamid Ahmadi Dazaj (born 24 November 1988) is an Iranian professional futsal player. He is currently a member of Mes Sungun in the Iranian Futsal Super League.

Honours

Country 
 FIFA Futsal World Cup
 Third place (1): 2016
 AFC Futsal Championship
 Champion (1): 2016
 Runners-up (1): 2014
 Asian Indoor Games
 Champion (2): 2009 - 2017
 Grand Prix
 Runner-Up (1): 2015

Club 
 AFC Futsal Club Championship
 Champion (2): 2015 (Tasisat Daryaei), 2018 (Mes Sungun)
 Iranian Futsal Super League
 Champions (4): 2014–15 (Tasisat Daryaei) - 2015–16 (Tasisat Daryaei) - 2017–18 (Mes Sungun), 2018–19 (Mes Sungun)

Individual

References

External links 
 

1988 births
Living people
People from Tehran Province
Iranian men's futsal players
Futsal defenders
Elmo Adab FSC players
Melli Haffari FSC players
Shahid Mansouri FSC players
Tasisat Daryaei FSC players
Dabiri FSC players
Mes Sungun FSC players
Giti Pasand FSC players
Iranian expatriate futsal players
Iranian expatriate sportspeople in Kuwait
Iranian expatriate sportspeople in China